Peculiar Township is an inactive township in Cass County, in the U.S. state of Missouri.

Peculiar Township was established in 1872, taking its name from Peculiar, Missouri.

References

Townships in Missouri
Townships in Cass County, Missouri